Neunkirchen is an Ortsgemeinde – a municipality belonging to a Verbandsgemeinde, a kind of collective municipality – in the Bernkastel-Wittlich district in Rhineland-Palatinate, Germany.

Geography 

The municipality lies in the Hunsrück and belongs to the Verbandsgemeinde of Thalfang am Erbeskopf, whose seat is in the municipality of Thalfang.

History 
As a result of the turmoil of the French Revolution, Neunkirchen lay under French rule beginning about 1800. In 1814 it was assigned to the Kingdom of Prussia at the Congress of Vienna. Since 1947, it has been part of the then newly founded state of Rhineland-Palatinate.

Politics

Municipal council 
The council is made up of 6 council members, who were elected by majority vote at the municipal election held on 7 June 2009, and the honorary mayor as chairman.

Mayor 
The Mayor of Neunkirchen is Martin Jung.

Economy and infrastructure 
Neunkirchen is a rural residential community. There are small businesses serving local demands.

References

External links 

 Verbandsgemeinde website with further information about Neunkirchen 

Bernkastel-Wittlich